Jack Levin (born June 28, 1941) specializes in research on murder, prejudice and hate, sociology of aging and sociology of conflict at Northeastern University in Boston, Massachusetts.   He has interviewed and corresponded with brutal killers, such as the Hillside Strangler and Charles Manson, and other violent criminals: serial killers and rapists, mass murderers, and vicious hatemongers. He is also asked by news and television reports to comment on important occurrences of homicide or hate. Along with interviews, writing material, teaching classes, and research Levin has also given talks about violence or hate to groups including the White House Conference on Hate Crimes, Department of Justice, the Department of Education, OSCE’s Officer for Democratic Institutions and Human Rights and the International Association of Chiefs of Police.  Jack Levin has authored and co-authored over 30 books and has written and published over 200 articles.

Biography

Current 
Jack Levin, Ph.D. is currently the Irving and Betty Brudnick Professor of Sociology and Criminology Emeritus at Northeastern University in Boston, Massachusetts where he teaches one course per year, “Sociology of Violence and Hate.” His course is only offered in the Fall semester and is held in Shillman Hall due to its large class size. He specializes in criminology, prejudice, and aging and is considered an authority on serial killers, mass murderers, and hate crimes. He is also the co-director of the Brudnick Center on Conflict and Violence at Northeastern University. Additionally he is known to be a direct descendant of Albert Einstein.
Levin was honored by the Massachusetts Council for Advancement and Support of Education as its “Professor of the Year” and has received awards from the American Sociological Association, New England Sociological Association, Eastern Sociological Society, Association for Applied and Clinical Sociology, and Society for the Study of Social Problems.

Books/publications 
Levin has authored or co-authored 33 books, including:
   The Allure of Premeditated Murder
 Mass Murder: America’ s Growing Menace
 Killer on Campus
 Overkill: Mass Murder and Serial Killing Exposed
 The Will to Kill: Making Sense of Senseless Murder
 The Violence of Hate
 Blurring the Boundaries: The Declining Significance of Age
 Serial Killers and Sadistic Murderers: Up Close and Personal.
 Extreme Killing: Understanding Serial and Mass Murder
 Why We Hate
 Hate Crimes Revisited: America's War on Those who are Different
 Ageism: Prejudice and Discrimination Against the Elderly
 Hate Crimes: The Rising Tide of Bigotry and Bloodshed
 Hate Crime: A Global Perspective

Teaching history 
 1968-1970: Assistant Professor at Boston University
 1970-1975: Assistant Professor at Northeastern University
 1975-1980: Associate Professor at Northeastern University
 1980–2016: Professor at Northeastern University

Major accomplishments 
 Winner of the 2009 Public Understanding of Sociology Award given annually by the American Sociological Association
 Levin recently received a Lifetime Achievement Award from the Society for the Study of Social Problems for his contributions to criminology
 Levin has published more than 200 articles in professional journals and newspapers, such as The New York Times, Boston Globe, Dallas Morning News, Philadelphia Inquirer, Christian Science Monitor, Chicago Tribune, and USA Today.
 He has appeared frequently on national television programs, including 48 Hours, 20/20, Dateline NBC, The Today Show, Good Morning America, Oprah, Rivera Live, Larry King Live, Inside Edition, and all network newscasts.

References 

 https://web.archive.org/web/20070103113901/http://www.violence.neu.edu/people/levin/
 http://www.northeastern.edu/socant/?page_id=325
 https://web.archive.org/web/20071115151239/http://www.violence.neu.edu/people/jack_levin_media_bio/

External links 
Personal website

Living people
Northeastern University faculty
People from Sharon, Massachusetts
1941 births
American sociologists